Valley Fork (also Valleyfork) is an unincorporated community in Clay County, West Virginia, United States.  It lies at an elevation of 1,024 feet (312 m).

References

Unincorporated communities in West Virginia
Unincorporated communities in Clay County, West Virginia
Charleston, West Virginia metropolitan area